Acrolophus pholeter is a moth of the family Acrolophidae. It was described by Davis in 1988. It is found in North America, including Florida. Larvae have been reported to feed on animal fecal matter, particularly that of tortoises.

References

Moths described in 1988
pholeter